Pseudelaphe is a genus of snakes of the family Colubridae.

Distribution
The species of this genus are found in Mexico, Belize, Guatemala, Honduras, and Nicaragua.

Species
Pseudelaphe flavirufa  - yellow-red rat snake
Pseudelaphe phaescens  - Yucatán rat snake

References

Colubrids